The women's 420 competition at the 2014 Asian Games in Incheon was held from 24 to 30 September 2014.

Schedule
All times are Korea Standard Time (UTC+09:00)

Results

References

Results

External links
Official website

Women's 420